John O'Donovan (23 January 1908 – 17 May 1982) was an Irish politician.

Early and personal life
He was born 23 January 1908 in Rockboro House, Macroom, County Cork, the son of Cornelius O'Donovan originally from Clonmel, an agricultural instructor, and his wife Hanna (née Twomey). He was educated at Catholic University School, Dublin, he obtained an entrance scholarship to University College Dublin (UCD), where he graduated BA in 1928 with first class honours in economics, history and jurisprudence. In 1929 he took a first class honours MA in economics and was awarded a travelling studentship, which he held at University College, Oxford, where he graduated B. Litt. in 1931. A Rockefeller foundation fellowship enabled him to spend the academic year 1931–1932 at Harvard Graduate School, the Brookings Institution and the University of Chicago. He later obtained a D.Econ.Sc. for The economic history of live stock in Ireland in 1940.

In 1933 he joined the Irish civil service as an administrative officer, being assigned first to the Department of the President of the Executive Council, followed by temporary secondment to the secretariat of the League of Nations. From 1935 he was an administrative officer in the Department of Finance, becoming private secretary to the minister, Seán T. O'Kelly in 1941. He was promoted assistant principal in 1943, and to principal in 1950; he dealt with the financial aspects of legislation and the finances of state-sponsored bodies. Described by T. K. Whitaker as having 'outstanding economic qualifications', his promotion to principal had been in breach of the usual seniority principle. In 1952 he left the civil service on his appointment as statutory lecturer in economic theory at UCD. He became associate professor of political economy in 1966, a position he held until his retirement from UCD in 1976.

Politics
He was elected to Dáil Éireann as a Fine Gael Teachta Dála (TD) for the Dublin South-East constituency at the 1954 general election. On his first day in the Dáil, O'Donovan was appointed Parliamentary Secretary to the Government. His close political relationship with John A. Costello was underlined by the taoiseach's decision to appoint him as special economic adviser to the cabinet and by his attendance at cabinet meetings.

He lost his seat at the 1957 general election, but was elected to Seanad Éireann by the Cultural and Educational Panel, where he served until 1961. He was unsuccessful candidate at the 1961 and 1965 general elections. At the 1969 general election O'Donovan returned to the Dáil as a Labour Party deputy for Dublin South-Central. O'Donovan lost his seat again at the 1973 general election.

Electoral law challenged
O'Donovan challenged the Electoral (Amendment) Act 1959, which had been passed by the Fianna Fáil government, on the basis that there were "grave inequalities" with "no relevant circumstances to justify" them. In O'Donovan v. Attorney-General (1961), the High Court held that the Act was unconstitutional and suggested that the ratio of representation to population across constituencies should differ by no more than 5%. The court, interpreting the "so far as it is practicable" condition of the Constitution, suggested a 5% variation as the limit without exceptional circumstances.

Later life
He lived for most of his life in Dundrum, Dublin with his wife Kathleen Mahon of Tullamore, whom he married in 1936. They had one son and five daughters. He died on 17 May 1982 at Kilcroney nursing home, Dublin.

References

 

1908 births
1982 deaths
Fine Gael TDs
Labour Party (Ireland) TDs
Members of the 9th Seanad
Members of the 15th Dáil
Members of the 19th Dáil
Parliamentary Secretaries of the 15th Dáil
Fine Gael senators
Alumni of University College Dublin
Alumni of the University of Oxford